This is a list of notable individuals and organizations who voiced their endorsement for the office of the president of Donald Trump as the Republican Party's presidential nominee for the 2016 U.S. presidential election.

Former U.S. federal government

Vice Presidents
 Dan Quayle, 44th Vice President of the United States (1989–93)
 Dick Cheney, 46th Vice President of the United States (2001–09)

Federal Cabinet-level officials 
 John Ashcroft, 79th United States Attorney General (2001–05)
 William Bennett, 3rd United States Secretary of Education (1985–88)
 John Rusling Block, 21st United States Secretary of Agriculture (1981–86)
 John R. Bolton, 25th United States Ambassador to the United Nations (2005–06)
 Elaine Chao, 24th United States Secretary of Labor (2001–09)
 Edwin Meese, 75th United States Attorney General (1985–88)
 Jim Nicholson, 5th United States Secretary of Veterans Affairs (2005–07)
 Anthony Principi, 4th United States Secretary of Veterans Affairs (2001–05)
 Donald Rumsfeld, 13th and 21st United States Secretary of Defense (1975–77, 2001–06)
 John W. Snow, 73rd United States Secretary of the Treasury (2003–06)
 Tommy Thompson, 19th United States Secretary of Health and Human Services (2001–05)
 James G. Watt, 43rd United States Secretary of the Interior (1981–83)

Federal departmental officials

 Charles F. Conner, former United States Deputy Secretary of Agriculture (2005–09)
 Liz Cheney, former Deputy Assistant Secretary of State for Near Eastern Affairs and head of the Middle East Partnership Initiative; daughter of former Vice President Dick Cheney

 William G. Boykin, ret. 3-star general, Deputy Under Secretary of Defense for Intelligence (2002–07)
 Chapman B. Cox, Assistant Secretary of the Navy (Manpower and Reserve Affairs) (1983–84)
 Michael Flynn, ret. 3-star General, Director of the Defense Intelligence Agency (2012–14) (Democratic)
 Jeffrey D. Gordon, Pentagon spokesman (2005–09)
 J. William Middendorf, United States Secretary of the Navy (1974–77)
 Joseph E. Schmitz, Inspector General (2002–05)
 Herbert R. Temple, Jr., Chief of the National Guard Bureau (1986–90)
 William Winkenwerder Jr., former United States Assistant Secretary of Defense for Health Affairs (2001–07)

 William Flynn Martin, United States Deputy Secretary of Energy (1986–88)

 Don M. Newman, United States Deputy Secretary of Health and Human Services (1985–89)

 Robert B. Charles, Assistant Secretary of State for International Narcotics and Law Enforcement Affairs (2003–05)

 Peter Ferrara, former associate deputy attorney general (1991–93)

Independent agencies and commissions 
 Gary Berntsen, officer of the Directorate of Operations (1982–2005)
 Vernon L. Grose, former member of the National Transportation Safety Board
 Dorcas Hardy, Commissioner of the Social Security Administration (1986–89)
 Kay Coles James, former Director of United States Office of Personnel Management (2001–05)
 Edmund C. Moy, Director of the United States Mint (2006–11)
 Daniel Oliver, Chairman of the Federal Trade Commission (1986–90)
 Linda M. Springer, Director of the United States Office of Personnel Management (2005–08)
 R. James Woolsey Jr., Director of Central Intelligence (1993–95) (Democratic)

U.S. Ambassadors
 Charles L. Glazer, El Salvador (2007–09)
 G. Philip Hughes, Barbados, Dominica, St Lucia, Antigua, St. Vincent, and St. Christopher-Nevis-Anguilla (1990–93)
 Douglas Kmiec, Malta (2009–11)
 John D. Ong, Norway (2002–05)
 Francis Rooney, Holy See (2005–08)
 Faith Whittlesey, Switzerland (1981–83, 1985–88)

White House staff 
 Pat Buchanan, White House Communications Director (1985–87)
 T. Kenneth Cribb Jr., Director of the Domestic Policy Council (1987)
 Michael Johns, co-founder and national leader of the U.S. Tea Party movement and former White House speechwriter
 Jeff Lord, White House associate political director (1987–88)
 Ed Rollins, Deputy Assistant to the President for Political Affairs (1980–81), Assistant to the President for Political Affairs and Director of the Office of Political Affairs (1981–83)
 John H. Sununu, 14th White House Chief of Staff (1989–91)

U.S. Congress

U.S. Senators

U.S. Representatives

U.S. state officials

State and territorial governors

State executive officials

State legislators 

 Arizona State Senators: Lori Klein, Thayer Verschoor,
 California State Senator: Tony Strickland
 California State Assemblymen: Martin Garrick
 Colorado State Legislators: Rep. B.J. Nikkel (Colorado Co-chairman and Colorado Women For Trump Coalition Director), Senator Greg Brophy (Colorado Co-chairman)
 Florida State Commissioner: Louis E. Sola
 Idaho State Representative: Phil Hart
 Iowa State Senators: Kitty Rehberg, Sandy Greiner
 Iowa State Representatives: Teresa Garman, Annette Sweeney, Dave Tjepkes, Kenneth Veenstra, Ralph Watts, Betty De Boef
 Louisiana State Senator: Troy Hebert (Independent)
 Michigan State Senators: Randy Richardville,
 Michigan State Representatives: Rick Johnson, Andrew Richner
 Ohio State Representatives: Matt Huffman
 South Carolina State Senator: Jake Knotts
 Texas State Representatives: Martha Wong, Wayne Christian
 Virginia State Senators: Jeannemarie Devolites Davis, Jeff McWaters

U.S. municipal officials

Mayors and county executives 

 Dewey F. Bartlett Jr., 39th Mayor of Tulsa
 Mary Hawkins Butler, Mayor of Madison, Mississippi
 Gabriel Campana, Mayor of Williamsport, Pennsylvania
 Lenny Curry, Mayor of Jacksonville
 Ed Mangano, 8th Nassau County executive
 Jean Stothert, 51st Mayor of Omaha

 Greg Edwards, 5th Chautauqua County executive (2006–13)
 Charles Evers, Mayor of Fayette, Mississippi (1969–81, 1985–89)
 Drew Ferguson, Mayor of West Point, Georgia, 2016 Republican nominee for Georgia's 3rd congressional district
 Tom Leppert, 60th Mayor of Dallas, Texas (2007–11)
 Rick Mystrom, Mayor of Anchorage (1994–2000)

Municipal executive officials 

 Joe Arpaio, sheriff of Maricopa County
 Rob Astorino, Westchester County Executive, 2014 Republican nominee for Governor of New York
 Paul Babeu, sheriff of Pinal County
 David A. Clarke Jr., sheriff of Milwaukee County
 James M. Cummings, sheriff of Barnstable County
 Ed Day, Rockland County Executive
 Greg Hartmann, member of the three-member in Hamilton County, Ohio
 Peggy Littleton, El Paso County Commissioner
 Dick Monteith, Chairman of the Stanislaus County Board of Supervisors
 Michelle Park Steel, Member of the Orange County Board of Supervisors
 Corey Stewart, Chairman of the Prince William Board of County Supervisors
 Carolyn Bunny Welsh, Chester County Sheriff

Municipal legislators 

 Joseph Borelli, Council member for the 51st District in the New York City Council, Minority Whip

 Vincent M. Ignizio, Council member for the 51st District in the New York City Council
 Andrew Stein, 22nd Borough President of Manhattan (1978–85) and New York City Council President (1986–94) (Democratic)

Retired U.S. military personnel

Retired U.S. Air Force personnel

Retired U.S. Army personnel

Retired U.S. Coast Guard personnel

Retired U.S. Marine Corps personnel

Retired U.S. Navy personnel

International political figures

Current heads of state and government 

 Hun Sen, Prime Minister of Cambodia (1985–present), president of the Cambodian People's Party (2015–present)

 Viktor Orbán, Prime Minister of Hungary (1998–2002, 2010–present), president of Fidesz (1993–2000, 2003–present)

 Miloš Zeman, 3rd President of the Czech Republic (2013–present), member of the Party of Civic Rights (2009–present), former leader of the Social Democratic Party (1993–2001)

 Robert Mugabe, President of Zimbabwe (1987–2017), Prime Minister of Zimbabwe (1980–1987), president of ZANU–PF (1980–2017)

Former heads of state and government
Australia
 Tony Abbott, Australian politician, MP, former Prime Minister of Australia (2013-2015), and former leader of the Liberal Party (2009-2015)

 Edgar Savisaar, Estonian politician, MP, former Mayor of Tallinn (2001–04, 2007–15), former Minister of Economic Affairs and Communications (2005–07), former Minister of the Interior (1995), former acting Prime Minister of Estonia (1990–92), and leader of the center-left Estonian Centre Party (1991–2016)

National ministers and secretaries 
Australia
 Andrew Peacock, Australian politician, MP, former Australian Ambassador to the United States (1997-1999), former Leader of the Opposition (1983–1985, 1989–1990), former leader of the Liberal Party (1983–1985, 1989–1990), former Minister for Industry and Commerce (1982-1983), former Minister for Industrial Relations (1980-1981), former Minister for Foreign Affairs (1975-1980), former Minister for the Environment (1975), former Minister for External Territories (1972), and former Minister for Defence and Minister for the Army (1969-1971)

 Subramanian Swamy, Indian politician, MP, former Minister of Commerce and Industry (1990–91), and member of the Bharatiya Janata Party

 Vojislav Šešelj, Serbian politician, MP, former Deputy Prime Minister (1998–2000), founder and president of the Serbian nationalist Serbian Radical Party (1991–present)

Members of national and supranational parliaments 

 Filip Dewinter, Belgian politician, Flemish MP and member of the Flemish nationalist Vlaams Belang party

 Ben Lobb, Canadian politician, MP and member of the Conservative Party of Canada

 Kenneth Kristensen Berth, Danish politician, MP, and member of the national conservative Danish People's Party

 Ilias Panagiotaros, Greek politician, MP, and member of the far-right Golden Dawn party

 Oren Hazan, Israeli politician, MK, and member of Likud

 Ulf Leirstein, Norwegian politician, MP, and member of the conservative-liberal Progress Party
 Carl I. Hagen, Norwegian politician, former MP, and former leader of the conservative-liberal Progress Party
 Christian Tybring-Gjedde, Norwegian politician, MP, and member of the conservative-liberal Progress Party
 Per-Willy Amundsen, Norwegian politician, MP, and member of the conservative-liberal Progress Party

 Mike Sonko, Kenyan politician, Senator and member of The National Alliance

Regional ministers, legislators, and party leaders 

 Pauline Hanson, Australian politician, Senator, and leader of the One Nation Party (1997–2002, 2014–)

 Andrey Rostenko, Russian politician, Mayor of Yalta, Crimea

 Tomio Okamura, Czech politician, leader of Freedom and Direct Democracy

 Mart Helme, Estonian politician, MP, former Ambassador to Russia (1995–99), and chairman of the national conservative Conservative People's Party of Estonia (2013–)

 Frauke Petry, German politician and leader of the Alternative for Germany

 Hamid Chabat, Moroccan politician, MP, Mayor of Fez, Secretary-General of the conservative Istiqlal Party (2012–)

 Geert Wilders, Dutch politician, MP, leader of the Freedom Party

 Janusz Korwin-Mikke, Polish politician, MEP, and leader of Coalition for the Renewal of the Republic–Liberty and Hope

 Jimmie Åkesson, Swedish politician, MP, and leader of the Sweden Democrats

 Andrej Šiško, leader of the Movement of United Slovenia

 Nigel Farage, British politician, MEP and leader of the UK Independence Party

Former regional ministers, legislators, and party leaders 

 Jean-Marie Le Pen, French politician, MEP, founder and former leader of the nationalist Front National (1972–2011)

 Aryeh Eldad, Israeli politician, former MK, member of Otzma Yehudit

 Carl I. Hagen, Norwegian politician, former MP, former Vice President of the Storting, and former leader of the conservative-liberal Progress Party (1978–2006)

 Sergey Markov, former Member of the Russian State Duma (2006–2008), member of United Russia, president of the Institute of Political Studies

Notable individuals

Commentators, writers, filmmakers, and columnists 

Conrad Black, Canadian-born British former newspaper publisher, author and member of the House of Lords
Eric Bolling, commentator, co-host of The Five and Cashin' In on Fox News
Andrew G. Bostom, author and expert on Islam
Floyd Brown, author, speaker, and media commentator
Ruthie Blum, journalist, columnist, former features editor of the Jerusalem Post, and current web editor at Algemeiner Journal
Lionel Chetwynd, screenwriter, motion picture and television film director and producer
James Corum, air power historian and scholar of counter-insurgency
Ann Coulter, political commentator and writer
Adam Curry, political commentator and former MTV VJ
Dinesh D'Souza, political commentator, author, and filmmaker
Vox Day, publisher, activist, science fiction writer, journalist, musician, and video game designer
Lou Dobbs, television personality, author, radio host and host of Lou Dobbs Tonight on Fox Business
Michael Scott Doran, senior fellow at Hudson Institute
 Matt Drudge, political commentator, founder and editor of The Drudge Report
 Aleksandr Dugin, Russian political scientist, author of The Foundations of Geopolitics: The Geopolitical Future of Russia and The Fourth Political Theory, and member of the Eurasia Party
 Diana Furchtgott-Roth, economist
 Brigitte Gabriel, journalist, author, political lecturer and anti-Islamic activist
 Pamela Geller, political activist and commentator
 George Gilder, investor, writer, economist, techno-utopian advocate, and co-founder of the Discovery Institute
 Joel Gilbert, filmmaker
 Callista Gingrich, co-author of Rediscovering God in America
 David P. Goldman (a.k.a. "Spengler"), economist, music critic, and author
 Leon Hadar, global affairs analyst, journalist, blogger and author
 Liangliang He, anchor on Hong Kong–based Mandarin and Cantonese-language broadcaster Phoenix Television
 Katie Hopkins, newspaper columnist and TV personality
 David Horowitz, conservative writer, founder and president of the David Horowitz Freedom Center, and editor of FrontPage Magazine
 Deal W. Hudson, conservative political activist
 Carol Iannone, columnist, literary critic, critic of feminism, and founding Vice President of the National Association of Scholars
 Paul Johnson, journalist, historian, speechwriter and author
 Dmitry Kiselyov, Russian journalist and head of government-owned international news agency Rossiya Segodnya
 Lawrence Kudlow, conservative commentator, economic analyst, television personality, newspaper columnist and host of The Kudlow Report
 Michael Ledeen, historian, philosopher, foreign policy analyst, and writer
 Herbert London, conservative activist, commentator, author, and academic
 John Lott, economist, political commentator, and gun rights advocate
 Scott McConnell, founding editor of American Conservative
 Gavin McInnes, writer, creative director, actor, comedian, and co-founder of Vice Media
 Brian Patrick Mitchell, writer, political theorist, and blogger
 Piers Morgan, journalist and television personality, writer for the Daily Mail
 Steven W. Mosher, social scientist, anti-abortion activist, author, and president of the Population Research Institute
 William Murchison, syndicated political columnist
 Deroy Murdock, political commentor and a contributing editor with National Review Online
 Melanie Phillips, newspaper opinion columnist
 Norman Podhoretz, conservative pundit, former adviser to the U.S. Information Agency (1981–87), and writer for Commentary
 David Portnoy, American internet celebrity, blogger, and founder of the sports and pop culture blog Barstool Sports
 Alfred S. Regnery, lawyer, author, and former publisher
 Michael Scheuer, former CIA intelligence officer, blogger, author, political analyst, and former Chief of the Bin Laden Issue Station
 Hossein Shariatmadari, Iranian conservative journalist and editor-in-chief of Kayhan
 Ross Terrill, academic, historian and journalist, expert in the history of China
 Cal Thomas, conservative syndicated columnist, pundit, author and radio commentator
 Emmett Tyrrell, conservative magazine editor
 Bradley C.S. Watson, political science educator, lawyer, and writer
 Slavoj Žižek, psychoanalytic philosopher, cultural critic, and Marxist

Businesspeople

 Sheldon Adelson, CEO of Las Vegas Sands
 Roger Ailes, former chairman and CEO of Fox News Channel, media consultant to presidential campaigns of Richard Nixon, Ronald Reagan, and George H. W. Bush
 David R. Barker, author, academic and businessman
 Thomas J. Barrack Jr., Founder and Chairman of Colony Capital
 Andrew Beal, Founder and Chairman of Beal Bank
 William Harrison Binnie, industrialist and investment banker, President of New Hampshire 1 Network and owner of Carlisle One Media, and Chairman of the Finance Committee for the New Hampshire Republican State Committee
 Ernie Boch Jr., CEO of Boch Industries
 Elliott Broidy, venture capitalist
 Doug Burgum, entrepreneur, philanthropist, former president of Great Plains Software, former head of Microsoft Business Solutions, chairman of the board for Atlassian, and 2016 Republican nominee for Governor of North Dakota
 Herman Cain, businessman and Tea Party politician (former 2000 and 2012 presidential candidate)
 Pete Coors, businessman and chairman of MillerCoors
 Jenny Craig, founder of Jenny Craig Inc.
 Jim Davis, owner and chairman of New Balance
 Darwin Deason, businessman and political donor
 Daniel R. DiMicco, former CEO of Nucor Corp
 Marc Faber, Swiss investor
 Sean Fieler, businessman, philanthropist and conservative activist/donor
 Steve Feinberg, financier and co-founder and CEO of Cerberus Capital Management
 Kenneth Fisher, investment analyst and the founder and chairman of Fisher Investments
 Steve Forbes, publishing executive, Editor-in-Chief of Forbes, and business magnate (former 1996 and 2000 presidential candidate)
 Brian France, CEO of NASCAR
 Neal B. Freeman, founder of The Blackwell Corporation, former president of the Corporation for Public Broadcasting
 Foster Friess, businessman and philanthropist
 David Green, businessman and CEO of Hobby Lobby
 Harold Hamm, entrepreneur and oil industry pioneer
 Stanley Hubbard, CEO of Hubbard Broadcasting
 Carl Icahn, business magnate, investor, activist shareholder, philanthropist, founder and majority shareholder of Icahn Enterprises and Chairman of Federal-Mogul
 Andrew Intrater, head of Columbus Nova and cousin of Viktor Vekselberg
 Peter Kalikow, president of H. J. Kalikow & Company
 Robert Kiyosaki, businessman, investor, educator, motivational speaker and self-help author (authored two business books with the candidate)
 Bill Koch, businessman, sailor, and collector
 Shalabh Kumar, industrialist, philanthropist, and founder and head of the Republican Hindu Coalition
 Charles Kushner, real estate developer and co-owner of Kushner Properties
 Jared Kushner, co-owner of Kushner Properties, owner of The New York Observer, son-in-law of the candidate
 Kenneth Langone, co-founder of The Home Depot
 Richard LeFrak, real-estate businessman
 Howard Lorber, businessman, investor and CEO of Vector Group
 Ted Malloch, CEO of The Roosevelt Group
 David Malpass, founder and president of Encima Global LLC, Deputy Assistant Treasury Secretary under President Ronald Reagan, Deputy Assistant Secretary of State under President George H. W. Bush
 Doug Manchester, businessman, real estate developer, and former newspaper publisher
 Linda McMahon, former president and CEO of WWE and Republican nominee for Senate from Connecticut in 2010 and 2012
 Robert Mercer, computer scientist and co-CEO of Renaissance Technologies
 Larry Mizel, chairman and CEO of MDC Holdings
 Steven Mnuchin, banker, political fundraiser, CEO of Dune Capital Management and Finance Chair of the Donald Trump 2016 presidential campaign
 Stephen Moore, economic writer, policy analyst, co-founder and former president of the Club for Growth, former member of the Wall Street Journal editorial board, and former chief economist for The Heritage Foundation
 Rupert Murdoch, media mogul, former CEO of 21st Century Fox
 Terry Neese, founder of Terry Neese Personnel Services and the Institute for the Economic Empowerment of Women
 John Paulson, hedge fund manager and president of Paulson & Co.
 Dan Peña, businessman and business coach
 Anthony Pratt, Australian billionaire, executive chairman of Visy Industries and Pratt Industries
 Joe Ricketts, founder, former CEO and former chairman of TD Ameritrade
 Wilbur Ross, investor, owner of WL Ross & Co., owner of International Steel Group, vice chairman of Bank of Cyprus
 Steven Roth, real estate investor and CEO of Vornado Realty Trust
 Phil Ruffin, businessman, owner of Treasure Island Hotel and Casino, and partner of Trump Hotel Las Vegas
 Anthony Scaramucci, financier, entrepreneur, author, founder and a co-managing partner of SkyBridge Capital, and host of Wall Street Week on Fox Business
 Martin Selig, founder and owner of Martin Selig Real Estate
 Patrick Soon-Shiong
 German Sterligov, Russian businessman and environmentalist
 Peter Thiel, entrepreneur, venture capitalist, hedge fund manager, co-founder of PayPal, board member of Facebook, libertarian, and transhumanist
 Donald Trump Jr., businessman, son of the candidate
 Eric Trump, businessman and philanthropist, son of the candidate
 Ivanka Trump, businesswoman, writer, and former model, daughter of the candidate
 Dana White, President of Ultimate Fighting Championship
 Vladimir Yakunin, Russian businessman, public figure, former president of Russian Railways, and founder and president of the World Public Forum "Dialogue of Civilizations"
 Richard Yuengling Jr., owner of Yuengling Brewery

Political strategists 
 Mark Corallo, political communications and public relations professional, co-founder and co-principal of Corallo Comstock
 Steve Hilton, British political strategist
 Paul Manafort, lobbyist, political consultant, and former director at the Center for the Study of Democratic Institutions
 Dick Morris, political author and commentator, former pollster, political campaign consultant, and general political consultant
 David Saunders, political strategist and author (Democratic)
 Roger Stone, political consultant, lobbyist, and strategist

Radio hosts 

 Mark Belling
 Anthony Cumia
 Mike Francesa
 Sean Hannity, also host of Hannity on Fox News Channel
 Laura Ingraham
 Rick Wiles (TruNews)
 Lars Larson
 Mark Levin
 Rush Limbaugh
 Dennis Prager
 Jeff Rense
 Michael Savage

Religious leaders 

 Jim Bakker, televangelist, former Assemblies of God minister and radio host
 C.L. Bryant, Baptist minister, radio and television host
 Mark Burns, pastor and co-founder of the South Carolina-based Christian TV network, The NOW Network
 James Dobson, evangelical Protestant author, psychologist, and founder of Focus on the Family
 Jerry Falwell Jr., president of Liberty University
 Jim Garlow, pastor of Skyline Church
 Norman Geisler, Christian systematic theologian, philosopher, and co-founder of Southern Evangelical Seminary
 John Hagee, founder and senior pastor of Cornerstone Church and CEO of Global Evangelism Television
 Bill Johnson, pastor of Bethel Church in Redding, California
 James F. Linzey, ordained minister in the Southern Baptist Convention
 Eric Metaxas, author, speaker, and radio host
 Mike Murdock, singer-songwriter, televangelist and pastor of the Wisdom Center ministry
 Frank Pavone, National Director of Priests for Life
 Ralph E. Reed Jr., conservative activist, former director of the Christian Coalition, founder of the Faith and Freedom Coalition, and 2006 Republican candidate for Lieutenant Governor of Georgia
 Pat Robertson, former Southern Baptist minister and chairman of the Christian Broadcasting Network
 Paula White, televangelist

Republican Party figures 

 Gary Bauer, politician and activist
 Morton Blackwell, Republican National Committeeman from Virginia
 Jim Brulte, Chairman of the California Republican Party
 Patrick Davis, political consultant and strategist
 Arnaldo Ferraro, Republican Party chairman of Kings County, New York
 Ed Gillespie, former chairman of the Republican National Committee (2003–05), former Counselor to the President (2007–09), and 2017 Republican candidate for Governor of Virginia
 Eric Greitens, 2016 Republican nominee for Governor of Missouri
 Josh Hawley, 2016 Republican nominee for Missouri Attorney General
 Tirso del Junco, former Chairman of the California Republican Party
 Joseph Mondello, Republican Party chairman of Nassau County
 Tom Pauken, former Chairman of the Texas Republican Party
 Reince Priebus, chairman of the Republican National Committee (2011–2017), former chairman of the Republican Party of Wisconsin
 Ronna Romney McDaniel, chairwoman of the Michigan Republican Party, member of the Romney family
 Christine Jack Toretti, Republican National Committeewoman from Pennsylvania
 Chuck Yob, former Republican National Committeeman from Michigan

Social and political activists 

 Christopher R. Barron, political activist and consultant, former national political director for Log Cabin Republicans, co-founder of GOProud, an organization representing conservative gays, president of CapSouth Consulting, and founder of LGBT for Trump
 Marjorie Dannenfelser, anti-abortion activist and president of the Susan B. Anthony List
 Elizabeth Emken, former president of Autism Speaks and Republican nominee for Senate from California in 2012
 Edwin Feulner, former president of the Heritage Foundation
 Day Gardner, founder and president of The National Black Pro Life Union and associate director of National Pro-Life Center
 Clarence Henderson, civil rights activist and participant in the Woolworth sit-in
 Alveda King, activist, niece of Martin Luther King Jr.
 Amy Kremer, Tea Party activist
 Trevor Loudon, author, speaker and political activist
 Jenny Beth Martin, co-founder and national coordinator of the Tea Party Patriots
 K. T. McFarland, Senior Fellow at the American Conservative Union
 Jimmy McMillan, rent activist, perennial candidate, and founder of The Rent Is Too Damn High Party
 Troy Newman, president of the anti-abortion organization Operation Rescue
 Grover Norquist, political advocate and president of Americans for Tax Reform
 CJ Pearson, political activist, political commentator and journalist
 Jerry Regier, founder and first president of the Family Research Council
 Brooke Rollins, president of the Texas Public Policy Foundation
 Austin Ruse, president of the Catholic Family and Human Rights Institute
 Phyllis Schlafly, president of the Eagle Forum and author of A Choice Not An Echo
 Matt Schlapp, president of the American Conservative Union
 Rocky Suhayda, white supremacist and chairman of the American Nazi Party
 Milton Wolf, physician, Tea Party activist and second cousin, once removed of Barack Obama

University and academic figures

Lawyers 
 Tony Buzbee
 Victoria Toensing
 Adam Walinsky (Democratic)

Other 
 Juanita Broaddrick, former nursing home administrator, accused Bill Clinton of rape
 Gennifer Flowers, former actress and author, had a sexual encounter with Bill Clinton
 David Duke, American neo-Nazi, antisemitic conspiracy theorist, far-right politician, convicted felon, and former grand wizard of the Knights of the Ku Klux Klan
 Paula Jones, former Arkansas state employee, accused Bill Clinton of sexual harassment
 Malik Obama, half-brother of Barack Obama
 Kathy Shelton, sexual assault survivor, Hillary Clinton was assigned as defense counsel for her rapist
 Jimmy Webb, enlisted Infantry Marine (2005–2010), son of former Democratic Senator and presidential candidate Jim Webb
 Kathleen Willey, former White House volunteer, accused Bill Clinton of sexual assault

Celebrities

Actors and comedians 

 Tim Allen
 Kirstie Alley
 Scott Baio
 Stephen Baldwin
 Roseanne Barr
 Morgan Brittany
 Jim Breuer
 Gary Busey
 James Caan
 Dean Cain
 Kirk Cameron
 Adam Carolla
 Julienne Davis
 Stacey Dash
 Robert Davi
 R. Lee Ermey
 Vincent Gallo
 Kelsey Grammer
 Lou Ferrigno
 Barry Humphries
 Paul Hogan
 Victoria Jackson
 Sean Kanan 
 Jerry Lewis
 Rich Little
 Jon Lovitz
 David McCallum
 Dennis Miller
 Michael Moriarty
 Kevin Nealon
 Jim Norton
 John O'Hurley
 Joe Piscopo
 Randy Quaid
 John Ratzenberger
 Antonio Sabàto Jr.
 Rob Schneider
 John Schneider
 Steven Seagal
 Nick Searcy
 Charlie Sheen
 Kevin Sorbo
 Kristy Swanson
Janine Turner
 Ann Turkel
 Jean-Claude Van Damme
 Jon Voight
 Fred Williamson
 James Woods

Adult entertainers

Athletes and sports figures 

 Kim Rhode

 Steve Kuclo

 Scott Hamilton

 Robin Lehner
 Max Domi

Media personalities and socialites

Singers and musicians

Newspapers, magazines, and other media

National
 The Washington Times, Washington, DC
 Florida Times-Union, Jacksonville, Florida
 New York Observer, New York City (owned by Jared Kushner, Trump's son-in-law)
 Las Vegas Review-Journal, Las Vegas, Nevada
 Long Island Jewish World, Long Island, New York
 The National Enquirer
 Santa Barbara News-Press, Santa Barbara, California
 St. Joseph News-Press , St Joseph Missouri
 The Times-Gazette, Hillsboro, Ohio
 The Crusader, the official newspaper of the Ku Klux Klan (denounced by Trump's campaign)

Foreign
 Israel Hayom, Israel's largest circulation newspaper.
 DPRK Today, North Korean state media

National organizations 
 American Energy Alliance
 Gays for Trump
 Great America PAC
 Hindu Sena, Indian Hindu nationalist organization
 International Defensive Pistol Association
 National Black Republican Association
 National Rifle Association
 Traditionalist Youth Network

State and local organizations 

 Log Cabin Republicans: Cleveland, Colorado, Georgia, Houston, Los Angeles, Miami, Orange County, and Texas chapters

Labor unions 
 Fraternal Order of Police
 National Border Patrol Council, largest border patrol union in U.S. representing 16,000 members (first presidential endorsement in union's history)

U.S. state political parties 
 Conservative Party of New York State
 Independent Party of Delaware

Minor political parties 
 American Freedom Party
 American Independent Party

Business leaders

See also 
 List of Hillary Clinton presidential campaign political endorsements, 2016
 List of Hillary Clinton presidential campaign non-political endorsements, 2016
 List of Gary Johnson presidential campaign endorsements, 2016
 List of Republicans who opposed the Donald Trump presidential campaign, 2016
 List of Bernie Sanders presidential campaign endorsements, 2016
 List of Jill Stein presidential campaign endorsements, 2016
 Newspaper endorsements in the United States presidential primaries, 2016
 Newspaper endorsements in the United States presidential election, 2016
 List of Donald Trump presidential campaign endorsements, 2020

Notes

References 

Lists of United States presidential candidate endorsements
Endorsements
2016 United States presidential election endorsements